"Jerk Out" is a song from The Time's 1990 album Pandemonium.  The song was originally recorded in December 1981 by  Prince at his home studio during sessions for What Time Is It?.  Prince originally performed all instruments and vocals and this recording remains unreleased.   Prince reworked the song in the spring of 1985 for the band Mazarati. The song was ultimately left off the Mazarati  album, though circulates among collectors. Again, the song was reworked in late 1989 for inclusion on Pandemonium Prince And Bruce DeShazer AKA Tony Christian From Mazarati Background Vocals Remain On Finish Track  and contains input by the band.

"Jerk Out" was released as the lead single from Pandemonium and became the group's highest-charting single, reaching number one on the U.S. R&B chart and number nine on the U.S. pop chart.  "Jerk Out" also peaked at number six on the dance chart. A maxi-single was also released with several remixes of the song. The Sexy Mixes were remixed by Steve Hodge, Jimmy Jam & Terry Lewis, Lance "L.A." Alexander and Tony "Prof-T" Tolbert.

Track listing

7" single
"Jerk Out" (Edit) – 3:54
"Jerk Out" – (Mo' Jerk Out) – 4:36

Maxi-single
"Jerk Out" (Sexy Mix) – 8:55
"Jerk Out" (Sexy Edit) – 4:36
"Jerk Out" (A Capella) – 2:28
"Jerk Out" (Sexy Dub) – 7:14
"Jerk Out" (Sexy Instrumental) – 7:02

Charts

Weekly charts

Year-end charts

See also
R&B number-one hits of 1990 (USA)

References

The Time (band) songs
1990 songs
Songs written by Prince (musician)
Paisley Park Records singles
Song recordings produced by Prince (musician)